Adult Contemporary is a chart published by Billboard ranking the top-performing songs in the United States in the adult contemporary music (AC) market.  In 2014, 11 different songs topped the chart in 52 issues of the magazine, based on weekly airplay data from radio stations compiled by Nielsen Broadcast Data Systems.

On the first chart of the year, the number one position was held by Kelly Clarkson with "Underneath the Tree", the song's fourth consecutive week at number one.  The following week, it was displaced by "Roar" by Katy Perry, which went on to spend ten consecutive weeks in the top spot, tying it for the year's longest unbroken run at number one with "All of Me" by John Legend, which spent the same length of time atop the listing during the summer.  As no artist had more than one chart-topper during the year, Perry and Legend also tied for the highest total number of weeks spent at number one by an act.  Both "Roar" and "All of Me" also topped Billboards all-genre chart, the Hot 100, although in the case of "Roar" this had occurred the previous September.  Another song to top both listings was "Happy" by Pharrell Williams, which Billboard identified as the biggest hit of the year in the United States.  The song, taken from the soundtrack of the film Despicable Me 2, was a success across multiple markets, and reached the number one position on Billboard charts ranging from Adult Contemporary to Hot R&B/Hip-Hop Songs.  It was also nominated for the Academy Award for Best Original Song.

Beginning in August, three consecutive Adult Contemporary chart-toppers were by acts from outside the United States, each of which was the act's first AC number one.  Beginning in the issue of Billboard dated August 23, British singer Sam Smith spent five weeks at number one with "Stay with Me".  The Norwegian duo Nico & Vinz then spent the same length of time atop the chart with "Am I Wrong", following which the Canadian band Magic! topped the chart for three weeks with "Rude", which also topped the Hot 100.  Despite the success of "Rude", the Canadian group would not return to the Billboard charts, and is regarded as a one-hit wonder in the United States.  The final number one of the year was Idina Menzel and Michael Bublé's version of the 1940s song "Baby, It's Cold Outside", which spent the last two weeks of 2014 in the peak position.

Chart history

See also
2014 in American music

References

2014
Number-one adult contemporary singles
United States Adult Contemporary